The Rise of a Tomboy is a 2016 Chinese romantic comedy film directed by Guo Dalei and starring Zhao Liying and Hans Zhang. It was released in China by Wanda Media and Wuzhou Film Distribution on March 18, 2016.

Plot 
This is a story about a university student who believed love has a formula to success and tried to prove it in a month. Her mom left her when she was young and she learn to be independent and strong. She eventually fell in love but to prove her formula works she follows her mind instead of her heart, but only to realize in the end that true love is about being able to feel the heartbeat of the other person.

Cast 
Zhao Liying
Hans Zhang
Jung Il-woo
Alan Dawa Dolma

Reception 

References

External links 

2016 romantic comedy films
Chinese romantic comedy films
Wuzhou Film Distribution films
Heyi Pictures films
2010s Mandarin-language films